Barbara O. Jones, also known as Barbarao, Barbara-O, and Barbara O., is an American actor from Ohio best known for her work in the films of the L.A. Rebellion movement of 1970s black filmmakers, starring in films by Haile Gerima and Julie Dash.   She also appeared on television alongside Muhammad Ali in Freedom Road and had smaller roles in other films including Demon Seed and on television.

L.A. Rebellion 

Jones appeared in a number of films by the new generation of young black filmmakers studying at UCLA in California. For Haile Gerima she starred in his student short Child of Resistance (1973), playing an imprisoned activist, and his feature debut Bush Mama (1979), both made at UCLA.  In Bush Mama she plays the wife of an imprisoned Vietnam veteran who becomes radicalized by poverty and oppression.

After an appearance in Julie Dash's student short Diary of an African Nun (1977) she starred in Dash's first feature Daughters of the Dust (1991), where she plays Yellow Mary, a prostitute returning to her home in South Carolina's Gullah community around 1900.

Other work 

Her first film role was starring in Robert L. Goodwin's black crime film Black Chariot (1971). Goodwin raised the finance for the film independently from the black community, raising many small donations including $5000 in grocery-store Blue Chip Stamps.
She had a small role in Donald Cammell's science fiction/horror movie Demon Seed (1977)

In 1979 she appeared alongside boxer Muhammad Ali in the TV miniseries Freedom Road.  Ali, in one of his few acting roles, played Gideon Jackson, an ex-slave elected to the U.S. Senate, and she played his wife.

In 1999 she had a lead role in Patrice Mallard's Mute Love, which draws on a number of elements from Daughters of the Dust. In 2001 she starred in Martin Mhando and Ron Mulvihill's film Maangamizi: The Ancient One, playing Asira, an American woman doctor visiting Tanzania.
She also had guest roles in TV shows including Laverne & Shirley, Wonder Woman, and Lou Grant.

References

External links 
 

Year of birth missing (living people)
Living people
American film actresses
American television actresses
21st-century American women